The Church of the Holy Virgin in Babylon El-Darag (Babylon of the Steps) is a Coptic Orthodox church in Coptic Cairo built in the 11th century AD.

History
The Church of the Holy Virgin in Babylon El-Darag was occupied from the 11th to the 15th centuries by several Coptic patriarchs, seven of whom were buried in the church. Pope Zacharias was one of them.

Pope Cyril VI of Alexandria used to pray in the church before assuming papacy. According to tradition, the church was one of the resting places of the Holy Family during their sojourn in Egypt, as well as the location from which Peter sent his epistle (1 Peter 5:13).

The relics of saints Demiana and Simon the Tanner are contained in the church as well.

Architecture
The ground plan of the church is typical of other Coptic churches: a narthex, a nave, a choir, northern and southern aisles and three sanctuaries. The northern sanctuary is dedicated to the Virgin Mary and the southern sanctuary is used as a shrine. It contains several 19th century icons of the Holy Virgin and saints Demiana, Stephen, Barbara, Shenouda, Paul the Hermit, Anthony, and Peter and Paul.

See also
Christian Egypt
List of Coptic Orthodox churches in Egypt

References

Bibliography

External links
Copticarchitecture.com

Coptic Orthodox churches in Cairo
Coptic Cairo
Coptic history
Coptic architecture
5th-century establishments in Egypt
5th-century churches
11th-century Oriental Orthodox church buildings
11th-century churches in Egypt